Colin Pinch (23 June 1921 – 17 November 2006) was an Australian cricketer. He played 63 first-class matches for New South Wales and South Australia between 1949/50 and 1959/60.

References

External links
 

1921 births
2006 deaths
Australian cricketers
New South Wales cricketers
South Australia cricketers
Cricketers from Sydney